Surabhi PU College is a pre-university college in  Bellary, Karnataka, India. It is affiliated to Karnataka Pre-University Education Board. It is located Near Hosuramma Temple, Chidhawadagi, Hospet.

Streams offered
The college offers courses in the below mentioned science streams
1. PCMB - Physics, Chemistry, Mathematics, Biology
2. PCMC - Physics, Chemistry, Mathematics, Computer Science

Facilities
1.	Well Equipped  Laboratories
2.	Library
3.	Indoor sports facilities
4.	Transportation Facilities

References

Pre University colleges in Karnataka